The men's 100 metres at the 2014 European Athletics Championships took place at the Letzigrund on 12 and 13 August.

The event was won by Great Britain's James Dasaolu, with defending champion Christophe Lemaitre of France in second, and Dasaolu's team-mate Harry Aikines-Aryeetey edging out fellow Briton Dwain Chambers for bronze. Pre-event favourite Jimmy Vicaut of France withdrew at the semi-finals tage with injury, despite running the fastest time in the heats.

Medalists

Records

Schedule

Results

Round 1
First 4 in each heat (Q) and 4 best performers (q) advance to the Semifinals.

Wind:

Heat 1: 0.4 m/s, Heat 2: -0.4 m/s, Heat 3: -0.1 m/s, Heat 4: -0.1 m/s, Heat 5: 0.0 m/s

Semifinals
First 2 in each heat (Q) and 2 best performers (q) advance to the final.

Wind:

Heat 1: -0.8 m/s, Heat 2: 0.6 m/s, Heat 3: -1.1 m/s

Final

Wind: -0.4 m/s

References

Results

100 M
100 metres at the European Athletics Championships